The Last Significant Statement To Be Made in Rock'n'Roll is the first EP by indie band The Indelicates. It was released on 12 February 2007.

Track listing
The Last Significant Statement To Be Made In Rock’n’Roll
Sixteen
Heroin
Unity Mitford (Acoustic)
Stars (Live)
The Last Significant Remix

References

External links
Press release
Homepage of the label including samples

2007 debut EPs